The 1998 Hajj stampede resulted in the deaths of at least 118 pilgrims on 9 April 1998 during the Hajj in Mecca during the Stoning of the Devil ritual on Jamaraat Bridge.

See also
Incidents during the Hajj

References

1998 in Saudi Arabia
20th century in Mecca
Disasters in religious buildings and structures
Incidents during the Hajj
Human stampedes in 1998
Human stampedes in Saudi Arabia
1998 disasters in Saudi Arabia